Berneck is a municipality in the Wahlkreis (constituency) of Rheintal in the canton of St. Gallen in Switzerland.

History
Berneck is first mentioned in 892 as Farniwang.  In 1210 it was mentioned as Bernanc.

Coat of arms
The blazon of the municipal coat of arms is Or a Vine Vert fructed Azure issuant from base of the second and twined around a stake Gules that is held by a Bear rampant Sable langued armed and in his virility of the third.  The presence of a bear ( and also the root of Bern) is a weak example of canting, where a symbol on the coat of arms forms a visual pun or rebus.

Geography

Of this area, 49.6% is used for agricultural purposes, while 29.6% is forested. Of the rest of the land, 20.3% is settled (buildings or roads) and the remainder (0.5%) is non-productive (rivers or lakes).

The municipality is located in the former Unterrheintal district of the Rheintal Wahlkreis.  It is between a line of hills and a side channel of the Rhine valley.  It consists of the village of Berneck and the hamlets of Kobel, Rüden, Taa, Husen, Hinterburg and Buechholz.

Demographics
, about 16.8% of the population was made up of foreign nationals. Of the foreign population,, 60 are from Germany, 114 are from Italy, 190 are from ex-Yugoslavia, 72 are from Austria, 15 are from Turkey,  and 38 are from another country. Over the last 10 years the population has grown at a rate of 3.7%. Most of the population speaks German (93.3%), with Italian being second most common ( 1.9%) and Albanian being third ( 1.6%). Of the Swiss national languages, 3,068 speak German, 5 people speak French, 61 people speak Italian, and 1 person speaks Romansh.

The age distribution, in Berneck is; 394 children or 12.0% of the population are between 0 and 9 years old and 505 teenagers or 15.4% are between 10 and 19.  Of the adult population, 345 people or 10.5% of the population are between 20 and 29 years old.  529 people or 16.1% are between 30 and 39, 498 people or 15.1% are between 40 and 49, and 395 people or 12.0% are between 50 and 59.  The senior population distribution is 295 people or 9.0% of the population are between 60 and 69 years old, 182 people or 5.5% are between 70 and 79, there are 122 people or 3.7% who are between 80 and 89, and there are 24 people or 0.7% who are between 90 and 99.  

 there were 383 persons (or 11.6% of the population) who were living alone in a private dwelling.  There were 729 (or 22.2%) persons who were part of a couple (married or otherwise committed) without children, and 1,836 (or 55.8%) who were part of a couple with children.  There were 207 (or 6.3%) people who lived in single parent home, while there are 34 persons who were adult children living with one or both parents, 12 persons who lived in a household made up of relatives, 22 who lived household made up of unrelated persons, and 66 who are either institutionalized or live in another type of collective housing.

In the 2007 federal election the most popular party was the SVP which received 30.5% of the vote.  The next three most popular parties were the CVP (23.3%), the FDP (21%) and the SP (12.2%).

The entire Swiss population is generally well educated.  In Berneck about 76.1% of the population (between age 25-64) have completed either non-mandatory upper secondary education or additional higher education (either university or a Fachhochschule).  Out of the total population in Berneck, the highest education level completed by 692 people (21.0% of the population) was Primary, while 1,269 (38.6%) have completed Secondary, 386 (11.7%) have attended a Tertiary school, and 106 (3.2%) are not in school.  The remainder did not answer this question.

The historical population is given in the following table:

Economy
, Berneck had an unemployment rate of 1.64%.  , there were 109 people employed in the primary economic sector and about 40 businesses involved in this sector.  725 people are employed in the secondary sector and there are 55 businesses in this sector.  782 people are employed in the tertiary sector, with 114 businesses in this sector.

 the average unemployment rate was 3.4%.  There were 228 businesses in the municipality of which 58 were involved in the secondary sector of the economy while 135 were involved in the third.

 there were 623 residents who worked in the municipality, while 1,061 residents worked outside Berneck and 1,118 people commuted into the municipality for work.

Religion

Of the rest of the population, there are 25 individuals (or about 0.76% of the population) who belong to the Orthodox Church, and there are 103 individuals (or about 3.13% of the population) who belong to another Christian church. There are 155 (or about 4.71% of the population) who are Islamic. There are 7 individuals (or about 0.21% of the population) who belong to another church (not listed on the census), 189 (or about 5.75% of the population) belong to no church, are agnostic or atheist, and 74 individuals (or about 2.25% of the population) did not answer the question.

Sights
There are three regions which are designated as part of the Inventory of Swiss Heritage Sites.  The first is the urbanized village of Berneck.  The second is the Schlosslandschaft Ober/Unterrheintal, a concentration of castles that spans Altstätten, Balgach, Berneck and Marbach.  While the third is the shared, urbanized village of Balgach/Herrbrugg, which is shared between Au (SG), Balgach and Berneck.

Notable citizens
 Johannes Dierauer, historian and librarian 
 Felix Indermaur, winemaker, clergyman, Watchman
 Rahel Indermaur, opera singer

Citizens born outside of Berneck 
 Heinrich Federer, Catholic priest (whose father Johann Paul Federer was from Berneck)
 Roger Federer, tennis player (whose father Robert Federer is from Berneck)

Notable families
 Federer family
 In der Maur

References

External links
 Germeinde Berneck Official website 
 

Municipalities of the canton of St. Gallen